Bullard High School may refer to:
 Bullard High School (Fresno, California), in the Fresno Unified School District
 Bullard High School (Bullard, Texas), in the Bullard Independent School District